The Marion County Fair is an annual fair held in Marion County, Indiana, United States. The fair was first held in 1930 and usually runs for ten days in late June, except that in 2020, because of the COVID-19 pandemic, the fair was moved to July 11–19.

The fair maintains a rural theme despite being located in the most populous county in Indiana, with 4-H exhibits, live music, traditional dance shows, and historical displays.

There was no fair between 1942 and 1945 because of World War II.

Since 2020, strict measures are undertaken, such as wearing masks and social distancing.

See also
Indiana State Fair
List of attractions and events in Indianapolis

External links
Marion County Fair

Annual fairs
Recurring events established in 1930
Tourist attractions in Marion County, Indiana
Festivals in Indianapolis
Fairs in the United States
Festivals established in 1930
1930 establishments in Indiana